The Ağrı Subregion (Turkish: Ağrı Alt Bölgesi) (TRA2) is a statistical subregion in Turkey.

Provinces 

 Ağrı Province (TRA21)
 Kars Province (TRA22)
 Iğdır Province (TRA23)
 Ardahan Province (TRA24)

See also 

 NUTS of Turkey

External links 
 TURKSTAT

Sources 
 ESPON Database

Statistical subregions of Turkey